The 2010–11 Hofstra Pride men's basketball team represented Hofstra University in the 2010–11 NCAA Division I men's basketball season. The Pride, led by head coach Mo Cassara, played their home games at the Mack Sports Complex in Hempstead, New York, as members of the Colonial Athletic Association. The Pride finished in a tie for second in the CAA during the regular season, earning the third seed in the CAA tournament. Hofstra won its first game in the tournament, but was eliminated in the semifinals by Old Dominion.

Hofstra failed to qualify for the NCAA tournament, but were invited to the 2011 College Basketball Invitational. The Pride were eliminated in the first round of the CBI in a loss to Evansville, 77–70.

Roster 

Source

Schedule and results

|-
!colspan=9 style=|Regular season

|-
!colspan=9 style=}| CAA tournament

|-
!colspan=9 style=| CBI

Source

References

Hofstra Pride men's basketball seasons
Hofstra
Hofstra
Hofstra men's basketball
Hofstra men's basketball